The Nebraska & Texas – Czech Republic State Partnership is one of 25 (as of March 2023) European partnerships that make-up the U.S. European Command State Partnership Program and one of 88 (as of March, 2023) worldwide partnerships that make-up the National Guard State Partnership Program. The Czech Republic partnership with Nebraska and Texas began in 1993.

History
In 1992, Czechoslovakia split to form Czech Republic and Slovakia. The State Partnership relationship with Nebraska and Texas was established the following year. The Czech Republic joined NATO on 12 March 1999, and the European Union on 1 May 2004. Czech forces contributed to the International Security Assistance Force in Afghanistan from 2002 to 2014, and the Resolute Support Mission (RSM) since 2015.

Partnership focus
The focus for the partnership is Special Forces, cyber operations, deployment interoperability, and disaster management.

Future Years Proposed Events (FY13 & FY14):
 Battlefield Trauma Care
 Special Forces 
 Aerial Refueling
 Chemical Biological Radiological & Nuclear (CBRN)
 Joint Terminal Attack Controller/ Forward Air Controller (JTAC/FAC)
 Cyber Defense

Gallery

References

External links

  Brief description of this partnership.
  Two group photographs of the Czech Partnership group.
  A brief history of U.S. diplomatic relations with Czechia since 1993. 
  A more detailed history of diplomatic relations with the Czech Republic.
  Official website

National Guard (United States)
Military alliances involving the United States
Czech Republic–United States military relations